The Epic Series is a series of mountain bike stage races held around the world. The most prestigious race is the Cape Epic. The other five functions as qualifier for it.

History
In 2018 the parliament of the Canton of Grisons signed a four-year contract with the Swiss Epic that they spend 300.000 CHF each year. They will become a good pendant to the Cape Epic.

Races

Source:

Qualifications

Performance Allocation
The winners of the men's, women's, mixed, Masters and Grand Masters receive a spot at the following Cape Epic. The second placed teams of the Swiss Epic receive also a spot.

Draw Allocation
One spot per category will be drawn at the final days. Only finisher of the event and no winner's are able to win the spot.

Epic Series Legend Race
The three big races Cape Epic, Swiss Epic and The Pioneer are so called Legend Races.

Epic Legend Medal
Bikers who finished all three Legend races receive the Epic Legend Medal.

References

External links